Chak No.65-GB Mukandpur is a historical village located about 25 kilometers towards south of Faisalabad and nearly 10 kilometres toward north of Jaranwala on Jaranwala - Faisalabad in Tehsil Jaranwala of District Faisalabad in Pakistan.

Education
The village has one girls' high school and one primary boys' school.

References 

Villages in Faisalabad District